The railway from Le Mans to Angers is an important French 132-kilometre long railway line. It is used for passenger (express, regional and suburban) and freight traffic. The railway was opened in 2 stages in 1863.

Traffic
TGV
TER Pays de la Loire
 freight

Main stations
 Le Mans station
 Sablé-sur-Sarthe station
 Angers-Saint-Laud station

Line history

The section between Le Mans and Sablé (48 km) was opened in March 1863
 Sablé - Angers (84 km): December 1863

References

Mans - Angers